Scotstounhill railway station serves Scotstounhill in Glasgow, Scotland.

Services 
 2tph to Whifflet via Glasgow Central Low Level, with one through to Motherwell
 2tph to Cumbernauld via Glasgow Queen Street Low Level
 4tph to Dalmuir, with 2 continuing through to Dumbarton Central

Additional services to/from Garscadden stop at peak periods.  On Sundays there are 2tph to Balloch and to Glasgow Central L.L (and thence alternately to Larkhall and Motherwell via the Hamilton Circle).

Notes

Sources

External links

 Pictorial History of Scotstounhill Station
 RAILSCOT on Glasgow, Yoker and Clydebank Railway

Railway stations in Glasgow
Former North British Railway stations
Railway stations in Great Britain opened in 1883
SPT railway stations
Railway stations served by ScotRail